KBSI (channel 23) is a television station licensed to Cape Girardeau, Missouri, United States, serving as the Fox affiliate for Southeastern Missouri, the Purchase area of Western Kentucky, Southern Illinois, and Northwest Tennessee. It is owned by the Community News Media subsidiary of Standard Media alongside Paducah, Kentucky–licensed MyNetworkTV affiliate WDKA (channel 49). Both stations share studios on Enterprise Street in Cape Girardeau, while KBSI's transmitter is located in unincorporated Cape Girardeau County north of the city.

History
The station signed on the air on September 10, 1983, as an independent station and aired an analog signal on UHF channel 23. The station was originally owned by Cape Girardeau Family Television, Ltd., in turn 51 percent owned by Media Central of Chattanooga, Tennessee. It was not the first independent to operate in the market—two stations broadcast in southern Illinois, and a prior attempt had been made at an independent in Paducah—but it was the first to cover all of it, which was the reason Media Central had been attracted to the area.

Media Central filed for bankruptcy in 1987 to fend off a hostile takeover attempt. That same year, despite having passed on the opportunity a year prior, KBSI joined Fox. Media Central continued to own the station until a bankruptcy judge approved its acquisition by Engles Communications, owned by David Engles, a former Warner Bros. and NBC radio executive. Under Engles, KBSI picked up the first season of NYPD Blue when ABC affiliate WSIL-TV refused to air the show.

Engles then sold the station to Max Television (later Max Media Properties) in 1995. In 1998, Sinclair Broadcast Group acquired most of the Max Media Properties stations, including KBSI; it owned KBSI and later WDKA in Paducah until both were sold to Community News Media for $28 million in a transaction that closed in 2021.

Programming

Syndicated programming
Syndicated programming on KBSI includes Two and a Half Men, The Big Bang Theory, Modern Family, and Judge Judy among others.

Newscasts
From 2006 to September 30, 2010, NBC affiliate WPSD-TV (owned by the Paxton Media Group) produced a nightly prime time newscast for KBSI through a news share agreement. When the WPSD newscast started, KBSI competed with another nightly half-hour newscast at 9 p.m. on the area's low-powered CW affiliates WQTV-LP/WQWQ-LP. That newscast, produced by CBS affiliate KFVS-TV, focused on news from southeastern Missouri and was eventually canceled on July 29, 2007.

On October 1, 2010, KBSI entered into a new agreement with KFVS to produce the newscast, which expanded to an hour in length. This agreement ended in March 2022 with KFVS moving the newscast to KFVS-DT2. On March 28, 2022, KBSI debuted its own newscast, produced out of Lincoln, Nebraska, at sister station KLKN. The news and weather anchors are based in Lincoln while the reporters work out of the KBSI studios in Cape Girardeau.

Technical information

Subchannels
The station's digital signal is multiplexed:

Analog-to-digital conversion
KBSI shut down its analog signal, over UHF channel 23, on February 17, 2009, the original target date in which full-power television stations in the United States were to transition from analog to digital broadcasts under federal mandate (which was later pushed back to June 12, 2009). The station's digital signal remained on its pre-transition UHF channel 22. Through the use of PSIP, digital television receivers display the station's virtual channel as its former UHF analog channel 23.

References

External links
KBSI "Fox 23"
WDKA
KFVS-TV

Comet (TV network) affiliates
Defy TV affiliates
TrueReal affiliates
Scripps News affiliates
Television channels and stations established in 1982
Television stations in the Paducah–Cape Girardeau–Harrisburg market
Fox network affiliates
1982 establishments in Missouri